This article lists the described fly species of the family Asilidae. There are about 7100 described species worldwide in this family.

A
B
C
D
E
F
G
H
I
J
K
L
M
N
O
P
Q
R
S
T
U
V
W
Y
Z

References 

Asilidae